Dirk van de Put (born 1959/60) is a Belgian businessman, and the chairman and chief executive officer (CEO) of Mondelez International. CEO since November 2017, he also became chairman in April 2018.

Early life
Van de Put is a native of Mechelen, Antwerp Province, Belgium, and has a veterinary medicine degree from Ghent University, and a master's degree in business from the University of Antwerp. He is fluent in Dutch, English, French, Spanish, and Portuguese.

Career
Van de Put worked for Coca-Cola, Mars Inc, Novartis and Groupe Danone, before becoming CEO of the Canadian frozen foods manufacturer McCain Foods in 2010. He is a non-executive director of Mattel.

In November 2017, he succeeded Irene Rosenfeld as CEO of Mondelez International. He also became chairman in April 2018.

Personal life
Van de Put has Belgian and US citizenship.

References

Belgian businesspeople
Belgian chief executives
Living people
Ghent University alumni
University of Antwerp alumni
People from Mechelen
Year of birth missing (living people)